

Paleontologists
 Birth of Othniel Charles Marsh on October 29; noted for naming many dinosaur families and genera, including Apatosaurus and Allosaurus.

References

1830s in paleontology
Paleontology